Procrica parva is a species of moth of the family Tortricidae. It is found in Kenya.

References

	

Endemic moths of Kenya
Moths described in 2002
Archipini